Yeso is an unincorporated desert village in De Baca County, New Mexico, United States, located along U.S. Route 60 west of Fort Sumner.  The post office serving zip code 88136 is the only business or service in Yeso; there are also perhaps a half dozen houses.

History
Yeso was laid out in 1906 when the railroad was extended to that point. The community took its name from nearby Yeso Creek. The post office has been in operation at Yeso since 1909.

References

Unincorporated communities in De Baca County, New Mexico
Unincorporated communities in New Mexico